Mount Moffett is a mountainous stratovolcano that forms the summit of Adak Island of the Aleutian Islands in the U.S. state of Alaska. Its peak reaches . It is heavily glaciated and is made primarily of high alumina basalt and andesite. It has never had an eruption in recorded history. The southern flank of the mountain is assumed to be its youngest side. In comparison to other Aleutian stratovolcanoes, Moffett is a small vent, characteristic of its mixed composition.

It was named by the U.S. Navy in 1936 for Rear Admiral William Adger Moffett.

It has occasionally been skied with there once being a ski-lift on the lower portion.

References
 
 

Footnotes

Mountains of Alaska
Stratovolcanoes of the United States
Aleutian Range
Volcanoes of Alaska
Landforms of Aleutians West Census Area, Alaska
Mountains of Unorganized Borough, Alaska
Volcanoes of Unorganized Borough, Alaska
Holocene stratovolcanoes